Sighs Trapped by Liars is the fourth collaboration between the experimental rock band Red Krayola and the conceptual art group Art & Language, released on September 17, 2007, by Drag City.

Critical reception
The Times gave the album a mixed review, writing that the "Krayola back two hesitant and foul-mouthed chanteuses singing uncharacteristically pretty yet typically unfocused tunes."

Track listing

Personnel 
Red Krayola
John McEntire – drums, recording
Jim O'Rourke – acoustic guitar, harmonica, synthesizer, backing vocals, mixing, recording
Mayo Thompson – acoustic guitar, piano
Tom Watson – bass guitar, guitar

Additional musicians and production
Art & Language – illustration, photography
Scott Benzel – recording
Noel Kupersmith – bass guitar
Dan Osborn – design
Arthur Ou – photography
Elisa Randazzo – vocals, recording
Roger Seibel – mastering
Sandy Yang – vocals

References 

2007 albums
Drag City (record label) albums
Red Krayola albums